Jessica Kellgren-Fozard (née Kellgren-Hayes; born 25 January 1989) is a British YouTuber and television personality. She is known for her videos on disability awareness, LGBT history, and vintage fashion. She began making YouTube videos in 2011 and has since gained over 900,000 subscribers.

Early life
Kellgren-Fozard was born in Camden, London and grew up in Bristol. Her mother, Lee Kellgren, is a dyslexic artist and printmaker, and her father, Derek W. Hayes, is an animator and director. She has one younger brother. She is the granddaughter of Jonas Kellgren (1911–2002), the first professor of rheumatology in the UK at the University of Manchester. She is of Swedish, American, and Russian descent on her mother's side.

Kellgren-Fozard is a Quaker and attended Sidcot School in Winscombe. She finished her secondary school education at Cotham School at the age of 19. She initially pursued a local BTEC diploma in Art and Design. She then studied at the University of Brighton, graduating with a Bachelor of Arts in Film and Screen Studies.

Career

Broadcasting
In 2008, she participated in the BBC Three reality television series Britain's Missing Top Model, finishing in third place.

In 2014, she was on screen talent for Brighton-based LatestTV. In 2015, she co-hosted LatestTV's movie review series such as PostFeature and Movie Line and interviewed filmmakers on FilmFest. In 2016, she hosted her own educational entertainment television show called Quintessentially Jessica.

YouTube
Kellgren-Fozard's videos cover a range of topics including vintage fashion and beauty, disability issues, and LGBT issues and history.

In 2019, she partnered with The School of Life for the YouTube Originals series "The School of..." on the YouTube Premium service, narrated by Alain de Botton where seven popular YouTube creators cover a philosophical topic important to them. Jessica's episode is about the secrets of happiness. 

In December 2020, fellow YouTuber Daniel Howell selected Kellgren-Fozard to be featured on YouTube U.K.'s creator campaign The Rise, in which ten established YouTube personalities each highlighted a "rising star" of their choosing.

Personal life
Kellgren-Fozard is deaf, which is caused by her disabilities: hereditary neuropathy with liability to pressure palsy, Ehlers–Danlos syndrome, and postural orthostatic tachycardia syndrome.

Kellgren-Fozard is a lesbian. She lives in Brighton with her wife, Claudia, a former dentist. They married at a Quaker meeting house in Bristol, in September 2016. The couple announced on 1 January 2021 that Claudia was pregnant with their first child. Their son, Rupert Henrik Kan Kellgren-Fozard, was born on 4 June via elective caesarean section due to the baby being in breech position. His middle names are a tribute to Jessica and Claudia's maternal grandfathers. Prior to the birth of their baby, the couple announced that they would not post pictures of his face on social media. Kellgren-Fozard has been vocal about her Montessori parenting of Rupert and frequently makes videos about it.

Awards and nominations
Kellgren-Fozard was awarded an honorary PhD from the University of Worcester in 2018 after being nominated by students for her work in disability awareness.

References

External links

1989 births
20th-century LGBT people
21st-century LGBT people
Alumni of the University of Brighton
Autism activists
English deaf people
Deaf television presenters
English people of American descent
English people of Russian descent
English people of Swedish descent
English people with disabilities
English Quakers
English YouTubers
Jessica
English LGBT entertainers
LGBT Protestants
LGBT YouTubers
Living people
Mass media people from Bristol
People educated at Sidcot School
People from the London Borough of Camden
People with dyslexia
People with Ehlers–Danlos syndrome
Television presenters with disabilities
YouTubers from London